The 2005 Greek Cup Final was the 61st final of the Greek Cup. The match took place on 21 May 2005 at Pampeloponnisiako Stadium. The contesting teams were Olympiacos and Aris. It was Olympiacos' thirty first Greek Cup Final and second consecutive in their 80 years of existence and Aris' seventh Greek Cup Final in their 91-year history. It was the first time that the match was held outside Athens or Thessaloniki Prefecture. It is characteristic that Aris had already been relegated to the second division during his presence in the final, with the result that the competitive and psychologically superior Olympiacos reached the conquest of the cup and consequently the double, while Dušan Bajević reached the 4th cup win as a coach. The following season, Aris, as a cup finalist played in the UEFA Cup thus becoming the first and only second division team in Greece that ever competed in any European competition.

Venue

This was the first Greek Cup Final held at the Pampeloponnisiako Stadium.

The Pampeloponnisiako Stadium was built in 1981 and was renovated once, in 2004. The stadium is used as a venue for Panachaiki. Its current capacity is 23,588.

Background
Olympiacos had reached the Greek Cup Final thirty times, winning twenty of them. The last time that they had won the Cup was in 1999 (2–0 against Panathinaikos). The last time that had played in a Final was in 2004, where they had lost to Panathinaikos by 3–1.

Aris had reached the Greek Cup Final six times, winning one of them. The last time that they had won the Cup was in 1970 (1–0 against PAOK). The last time that had played in a Final was in 2003, where they had lost to PAOK by 1–0.

Route to the final

Match

Details

See also
2004–05 Greek Football Cup

References

2005
Cup Final
Greek Cup Final 2005
Greek Cup Final 2005
Sport in Patras
May 2005 sports events in Europe